Rain and Shine is a 1977 Hungarian comedy film directed by Ferenc András.

References

External links 

1977 comedy films
1977 films
Hungarian comedy films
Films set in Lake Balaton